The 2001-02 West Coast Hockey League season was the seventh season of the West Coast Hockey League, a North American minor professional league. Eight teams participated in the regular season, and the Fresno Falcons were the league champions.

Regular season

Taylor Cup-Playoffs

External links 
 Season 2001/02 on hockeydb.com

West Coast Hockey League seasons
WCHL